The Clerk of the Privy Council is a senior civil servant in His Majesty's Government in the United Kingdom, being Head of the Privy Council Office.

This historic office is less powerful now than it once was and than its Canadian equivalent, whose holder serves ex officio as Head of the Canadian Civil Service, whereas these roles in the UK have been divided between the Cabinet Secretary and the Head of HM Civil Service.

Until 1859 there were multiple — usually four — clerks of the Privy Council. Three of the four positions then extant were progressively abolished in the 19th century until only one remained in 1859. The Clerk of the Privy Council is deputized by one or two Deputy Clerks, although the office of Senior Clerk has been established in the past.

Clerks in Ordinary, 1540–present

See also
 Honours Committee
 Clerk of the Privy Council (Canada)

References

External links

Privy Council of the United Kingdom